Passover is a major Jewish holiday that commemorates the Exodus of the Israelite people from Egypt, as described in the Torah.

Passover may also refer to:
Passover (Samaritan holiday), a holiday in the Samaritan religion, based on the story of the Israelite Exodus described in the Samaritan Torah
Passover (Christian holiday), a holiday among some Christian groups, derived from the Jewish observance and often linked with Easter
Passover, Missouri, a community in the United States
"Passover" (Rome), an episode of Rome
Passover (album),  an album by the Black Angels
"Passover", a song by Joy Division from Closer
"The Passover", a song by the Soundtrack of Our Lives from Communion
Pass Over, a 2018 film by Spike Lee of the Antoinette Nwandu play

See also
Pascha (disambiguation)
Korban Pesach, the Hebrew language term for Passover sacrifice
"A Rugrats Passover", a Rugrats episode